LoneStarCon may refer to:
 LoneStarCon 1, the 1985 North American Science Fiction Convention (NASFiC), held in Austin, Texas
 LoneStarCon 2, the 1997 World Science Fiction Convention (Worldcon), held in San Antonio, Texas
 LoneStarCon 3, the 2013 World Science Fiction Convention (Worldcon), held in San Antonio, Texas